The Navisbach is a small river of Tyrol, Austria.

Its route follows western direction until north of Steinach am Brenner where it merges with the Sill.

The Navisbach is one of the cleanest waters in Tyrol and has Grade A− quality. It provides the village of Navis (in the center of the valley) with drinking water.

References

Rivers of Tyrol (state)
Rivers of Austria